Working Stiffs is an American sitcom which starred James Belushi and Michael Keaton as brothers Ernie and Mike O'Rourke. The pair were janitors who aspired to work their way up in the field of business. The brothers worked in an office building owned by their Uncle Harry. Ernie and Mike also were roommates in an apartment over a cafe where they befriended the owner Mitch and waitress Nikki. Each episode featured slapstick and physical comedy. Penny Marshall directed the pilot.

The series aired on CBS. It competed against the highly-rated shows NBC's CHiPs and ABC's The Ropers in its timeslot. Nine episodes were produced but after four episodes aired, the series was canceled. After Belushi and Keaton became film stars in the 1980s, six episodes of the show were released on home video. Reruns have also aired on A&E Network, Comedy Central and TV Land. The syndication package included the previously unaired episodes.

Cast
James Belushi as Ernie O'Rourke
Michael Keaton as Mike O'Rourke
Val Bisoglio as Al Steckler
Allan Arbus as Mitch Hannigan
Lorna Patterson as Nikki Evashevsky

Recurring
Phil Rubenstein as Frank Falzone

Episode list

References

Brooks, Tim; Earl Marsh (2003). The Complete Directory to Prime Time Network and Cable TV Shows. Ballantine Books. .

External links 
 

1979 American television series debuts
1979 American television series endings
1970s American sitcoms
CBS original programming
English-language television shows
Television series by CBS Studios
Television shows set in Chicago